The Berry House is a historic house located in Beebe, Arkansas.

Description and history 
It is a rather modest -story wood-framed structure, three bays wide, with a front-facing gable roof, clapboard siding, and a projecting front entry porch supported by sloping square columns mounted on brick piers. The side-facing roof eaves have exposed rafter ends. Built c. 1930, it is the best-preserved example of this type of small Craftsman style house in Beebe.

The house was listed on the National Register of Historic Places on September 5, 1991.

See also
National Register of Historic Places listings in White County, Arkansas

References

Houses on the National Register of Historic Places in Arkansas
Houses completed in 1930
Houses in White County, Arkansas
National Register of Historic Places in White County, Arkansas
Buildings and structures in Beebe, Arkansas
American Craftsman architecture in Arkansas
Bungalow architecture in Arkansas
1930 establishments in Arkansas